Varna may refer to:

Places

Europe 
Varna, Bulgaria, a city in Bulgaria
Varna Province
Varna Municipality
Gulf of Varna
Lake Varna
Varna Necropolis
Vahrn, or Varna, a municipality in Italy
Varniai, a city in Lithuania
Varna (Šabac), a village in Serbia

Asia 
Varna, Azerbaijan, a village in Azerbaijan
Varna, Iran, previous name of Varamin, a city in Iran
Varna, Isfahan, a village in Iran
Varna, Russia, a rural locality (a selo) in Varnensky District, Chelyabinsk Oblast, Russia

North America 
Varna, Illinois, a village in the United States
Varna, New York, a hamlet in the United States
Varna, a rural community in the municipality of Bluewater, Ontario, Canada

Elsewhere 
Varna Peninsula, South Shetland Islands, Antarctica

Hinduism 
Varna (Hinduism), a social class based on the work of a human as said in Bhagvat Gita (now it is rather divided by birth of a person)
Varna, an attribute in Hindu astrology

Other uses 
Varna culture, neolithic culture of north-eastern Bulgaria
, a number of ships with this name
MFC Varna, a professional futsal team based in Varna, Bulgaria
Varna, the Telugu language name for the 2013 Tamil language film Irandaam Ulagam

See also 

Varnu, India
Verna (disambiguation)
Varuna (disambiguation)